"Did You See Me Coming?" is a song by English synth-pop duo Pet Shop Boys, released on 1 June 2009 as the second single from their tenth studio album, Yes (2009).

The single was made available in six formats: two-track CD, CD maxi, 12-inch vinyl, and three digital bundles, each with a different track listing. Presented are new tracks "After the Event", "The Former Enfant Terrible" and "Up and Down", which do not appear on Yes. There are also new mixes of album track "Did You See Me Coming?" by Pet Shop Boys and Unicorn Kid, and "The Way It Used to Be" mixed by Richard X. The Brit Awards medley, which was originally performed in February, is also released in one of the digital bundles.

The Possibly More Mix features significant extra lyrics inspired by common descriptions found in lonely hearts/singles adverts, such as "attractive, single, blue eyed, smart".

Track listings
2-track CD single
 "Did You See Me Coming?" – 3:41
 "After the Event" – 5:19

CD maxi single
 "Did You See Me Coming?" (PSB Possibly More mix) – 8:52
 "The Former Enfant Terrible" – 2:56
 "Up and Down" – 3:43

12-inch single
A1. "Did You See Me Coming?" (PSB Possibly More mix) – 8:52
A2. "Did You See Me Coming?" (Unicorn Kid mix) – 4:13
B. "The Way It Used to Be" (Richard X mix) – 8:39

German CD maxi single 
 "Did You See Me Coming?"
 "After the Event"
 "The Former Enfant Terrible"
 "Up and Down"

Digital bundle 1
 "Did You See Me Coming?"
 Pet Shop Boys Brit Awards medley

Digital bundle 2
 "Did You See Me Coming?" (Unicorn Kid mix)
 "The Way It Used to Be" (Richard X mix)

Digital bundle 3
 "Did You See Me Coming?" (PSB Possibly More mix)
 "The Former Enfant Terrible" (Bring it on mix)

US digital download
 "Did You See Me Coming?" (PSB Possibly More Mix) – 8:48
 "After the Event" – 5:16
 "Up and Down" – 3:41
 "The Former Enfant Terrible" (Bring It On Mix) – 7:22
 "Did You See Me Coming?" (Unicorn Kid Mix) – 4:08
 "The Way It Used to Be" (Richard X Mix) – 8:37

US digital download 2
 "Did You See Me Coming?" – 3:40
 "The Former Enfant Terrible" – 2:51
 "Pet Shop Boys "Brits" Medley" – 9:31

UK digital download
 "Did You See Me Coming?" – 3:40
 "Pet Shop Boys "Brits" Medley" – 9:31
 "Did You See Me Coming?" (Unicorn Kid Mix) – 4:08
 "The Way It Used to Be" (Richard X Mix) – 8:37
 "Did You See Me Coming?" (PSB Possibly More Mix) – 8:48
 "The Former Enfant Terrible" (Bring It On Mix) – 7:22

Charts

Weekly charts

Year-end charts

References

2009 singles
2009 songs
Parlophone singles
Pet Shop Boys songs
Song recordings produced by Xenomania
Songs written by Chris Lowe
Songs written by Neil Tennant